Ridgefield National Wildlife Refuge is a wildlife refuge, one of the national wildlife refuges operated by the United States Fish and Wildlife Service, located in the westernmost part of Clark County, Washington.
The refuge was established (along with 3 other refuges in the Willamette Valley of Oregon) in 1965, in response to a need to establish vital winter habitat for wintering waterfowl with an emphasis on the dusky Canada goose whose nesting areas in Alaska were severely impacted by the violent earthquake of 1964.
Ridgefield NWR is part of the Ridgefield National Wildlife Refuge Complex, headquartered in Ridgefield, Washington, which oversees the management of four refuges in the southwestern part of the state: Ridgefield, and three refuges in the Columbia River Gorge: Franz Lake, Pierce, and Steigerwald Lake. This place was closed in spring of 2019 to cut down Douglas fir and change the trail. In fall of 2020, the construction of a new multi-purpose building began. The new multi-purpose building will be a construction type V-B and consist of a 4,415 square foot single story building with an associated balcony and basement area. The building is being constructed to provide the fish and wildlife staff office space, meeting space, and an area for public visitors including volunteers and conservation partners.

Refuge units and activities
Conservation of the natural Columbia River floodplain is the management objective of the Carty,  self-guided hiking trail, Roth and Ridgeport Dairy units. The River 'S',  auto tour route and  seasonal hiking trail, and Bachelor Island units are managed to maximize habitat for waterfowl and other wetland wildlife.

Wildlife
Stately sandhill cranes, shorebirds, and a great variety of songbirds stop at the refuge during spring and fall migrations. Some bird species such as mallards, canada geese,  great blue herons, pheasant, ruffed grouse, barn owl, great horned owl, bald eagles, ospreys and red-tailed hawks are year-round residents that nest on the refuge. Black-tailed deer and cougars are the largest mammals on the refuge. Smaller mammal species such as coyote, red fox, raccoon, skunk, porcupine, bobcat, beaver, mink, river otter, muskrat, badger and brush rabbits are occasionally seen.

Quarries
The Carty Unit of the refuge includes seven historic quarries, listed on the National Register of Historic Places as Basalt Cobblestone Quarries District.

See also 
 List of National Wildlife Refuges

References

External links

Ridgefield National Wildlife Refuge U.S. Fish and Wildlife Service

Protected areas of Clark County, Washington
National Wildlife Refuges in Washington (state)
Wetlands of Washington (state)
Landforms of Clark County, Washington